Extra (originally titled Extra: The Entertainment Magazine from 1994 to 1996) is an American syndicated news broadcasting newsmagazine that is distributed by Warner Bros. Television Distribution and premiered on September 5, 1994. The program serves as a straight rundown of news headlines and gossip throughout the entertainment industry, providing coverage of events and celebrities; however, since 2013, it has also placed an even greater emphasis on interviews and insider previews of upcoming film and television projects. , the program's weekday broadcasts are anchored by Billy Bush, with the weekend editions anchored by Renee Bargh and Jennifer Lahmers.

History

The series was developed in the fall of 1993, for a planned launch during the 1994–95 television season. The program was developed under the working title Entertainment News Television; however due to claims that it too closely mirrored its own name, cable channel E! filed a lawsuit against Warner Bros. Television Studios and Telepictures to bar them from using the title; although E! lost the lawsuit in a summary judgment hearing allowing Warner Bros. to continue to use the ENT title for the series, Warner Bros. decided to change the name of the program to Extra: The Entertainment Magazine in May 1994, four months before the series made its debut, with Warner Bros. executives citing that the abbreviated ENT title itself would be too similar to that used by Entertainment Tonight, long shortened officially to just ET, possibly leading to viewer confusion and confusing Nielsen Media Research ratings diary homes which would have seen their panelists writing down the wrong program they watched.

The program was initially anchored by Dave Nemeth and Arthel Neville. Neville joined the program after being anchor at New Orleans ABC affiliate WVUE-DT (now a Fox affiliate) and a three-year run on Extreme Close-Up, a one-on-one celebrity interview show that she co-produced for E! Entertainment TV. Extra was initially distributed by Time-Telepictures Television, a joint venture between Time Inc. and Telepictures – both of which were owned at the time by Time Warner (which would eventually spin off Time Inc. in 2014) – that was absorbed by Telepictures in 2003. Nemeth and Neville were both replaced by Brad Goode and Libby Weaver on June 10, 1996 for the remainder of Season 2, and Season 3 (which premiered on September 9, 1996), before Weaver was replaced by Maureen O'Boyle in July 1997 during Season 3. O'Boyle took over as main anchor of the program in September 1997 during season 4 premiere; following O'Boyle's departure in September 2000, former Entertainment Tonight anchor/correspondent and talk show host Leeza Gibbons became its main anchor of season 7.

In September 2002, Telepictures debuted a spin-off series, Celebrity Justice. The program, which was hosted and executive produced by Harvey Levin, had originated as a segment featured on Extra that focused on legal issues involving celebrities and high-profile court cases with little to no relation to the entertainment industry; Celebrity Justice ran for three seasons before being cancelled in 2005 (Levin would subsequently launch the celebrity news website TMZ and three years later, partner with Telepictures and Warner Bros. Television Distribution on a more successful entertainment newsmagazine venture spun off from the site, TMZ on TV).

Following Gibbons's departure in 2004, Extra switched to a two-anchor format for the weekday editions with Sugar Ray lead singer/founder Mark McGrath and correspondent Dayna Devon (who was formerly a news anchor/reporter at ABC affiliates KMID and WATN-TV) taking over as presenters. In September 2007, the production staff of Extra also began handling production responsibilities for CW Now, a weekly lifestyle newsmagazine that aired as part of The CW's Sunday night lineup; that program was cancelled due to low ratings in February 2008, after 18 episodes, continuing to broadcast some CW interstitial segments for several more months after.

On July 28, 2008, Telepictures announced that actor Mario Lopez would take over as solo host of the program; Dayna Devon was moved to a correspondent role, while Mark McGrath chose to leave the show and return to his music career.

On September 13, 2010, Extra began broadcasting in high definition. the program also abandoned its longtime soundstage at Victory Studios in Glendale, California and moved its taping location to The Grove at Farmers Market, a well-known shopping and entertainment venue in Los Angeles.

On August 4, 2011, Telepictures announced that Maria Menounos (who had previously served as a correspondent for rivals Entertainment Tonight and Access Hollywood) would join Extra as Lopez's co-host, as part of an overall deal with Warner Bros./Telepictures that included a role as a contributor for the CW talk show Drew Pinsky's Lifechangers and development of television program projects. On September 9, 2013, at the beginning of its 20th season, Extra moved its taping location to Universal Studios Hollywood and its Universal CityWalk; at that time, following Menounos's decision to leave Extra to become co-host of E! News, actress/producer Tracey Edmonds and SportsNation-turned-Fox Sports Live co-host Charissa Thompson were added to replace her as co-hosts. Edmonds later left in June 2017. Thompson left at the end of the program's 23rd season.

On August 7, 2017, Telepictures announced co-host changes in preparation for the program's 24th season: former host/correspondent Tanika Ray would return to Extra as weekday co-host, with correspondents A. J. Calloway and current weekend edition host Renee Bargh also becoming weekday co-hosts. All join fellow host Mario Lopez. British TV personality Mark Wright will also join as weekday correspondent. Jerry Penacoli serves as an off-air correspondent for the series and is rarely seen, voicing most of the show's segments and stories that are not done from CityWalk.

On May 8, 2019, Telepictures announced a revamp for the program's 26th season, starting September 9, 2019; former Access Hollywood host Billy Bush will join as co-host, replacing Mario Lopez—who himself will move to rival Access Hollywood. It will also move to The Burbank Studios in Burbank, California where Access had previously been based. In the months before, Telepictures had signed an agreement with Fox Television Stations to move the series in a number of major top-10 to top-50 markets to syndication on Fox stations, ending a long-term agreement with NBC Owned Television Stations to syndicate the series to NBC's owned and operated stations.

On July 31, 2019, Calloway was terminated from Extra after a number of sexual harassment and assault allegations not involving show staff surfaced (he had previously been suspended earlier in February).

With Bush's arrival, the series was expected to be retitled Extra Extra for the new season (the show's title theme had long had "Extra!...Extra!" as its main focal point and as a regular segment, supporting the possible change in branding); however like the same issues the series ran into in 1994, it ran into legal issues preventing the change. ExtraExtra Show Daily, an entertainment industry expo trade magazine, had utilized the title since 1997 as a registered trademark. EESD owner Sandra Driggin notified Telepictures about possible confusion with her publication, a week before the show's premiere, and threatened legal action if the show aired as Extra Extra. Telepictures ultimately decided to retain the Extra name as-is, as the show's staff had not really taken up the new name behind the scenes during off-air rehearsals with Bush.

On-air staff

Current on-air staff

Anchor
 Billy Bush – anchor (2019–present)

Correspondents
 Renee Bargh – Australian correspondent (2010–present; previously served as Los Angeles correspondent and weekend anchor from 2010 to 2020 and weekday co-anchor from 2017 to 2019)
 Michael Corbett – special, lifestyle, home and real estate correspondent (2000–present)
 Alecia Davis - Nashville correspondent (2022–present)
 Tommy DiDario - correspondent
 Kaleigh Garris - correspondent
 Adam Glassman — special correspondent (2019—present)
 Carlos Greer - New York correspondent (2022—present)
 Samantha Harris – special correspondent/weekend fill-in anchor (2020–present; previously served as weekend anchor/correspondent 2003 to 2004)
 Jana Kramer — Nashville correspondent (2019–present)
 Katie Krause - correspondent (2021–present)
 Jennifer Lahmers — weekend anchor/correspondent/weekday fill-in anchor (2019–present)
 Rachel Lindsay — correspondent (2020–present)
 Melvin Robert - senior correspondent/weekend anchor (2022–present)
 Terri Seymour – special correspondent (2004–present)
 Charissa Thompson – Las Vegas correspondent (2019–present; previously served as a co-host from 2014 to 2017)
 Mark Wright –   correspondent (2017–present)

Former on-air staff
 Dana Adams – correspondent (1994–1997)
 Hilaria Baldwin – lifestyle correspondent (2012–2019)
 Doug Bruckner – correspondent (1999–2004)
 Michael Bryant – correspondent (2000–2005)
 Nate Burleson — New York correspondent (2019–2021, now co-host of CBS Mornings)
 A. J. Calloway – New York correspondent (2006–2019)
 Jamie Colby – correspondent (1999; now at Fox News)
 Adrianna Costa – correspondent (2010–2013)
 Olivia Culpo – correspondent (2013)
 Idalis DeLeon – correspondent (2003)
 Dayna Devon – anchor/correspondent (1999–2009; now at KTLA in Los Angeles)
 Carlos Diaz – correspondent (2005–2010; later at HLN and WTHR in Indianapolis)
 Tracey Edmonds – co-host (2014–2017)
 Leeza Gibbons – anchor/correspondent (2000–2003, later co-host of America Now)
 Brad Goode - anchor/correspondent (1996-1997)
 Bo Griffin – correspondent (2001; deceased)
 David Jackson – correspondent (1995–1999)
 Ben Patrick Johnson – senior correspondent (1994–1995)
 Jon Kelley – weekend anchor/correspondent (2000–2006, later at WFLD in Chicago; now host of Funny You Should Ask)
 Sean Kenniff – medical correspondent (2000–2001, later at WFOR-TV in Miami)
 Kurt Knutsson – correspondent (2000)
 Cheslie Kryst – New York correspondent (2019–2022, deceased)
 Elaine Lipworth – correspondent (1994–1999)
 Mario Lopez – weekday/weekend anchor (2008–2019; now co-host of Access Hollywood)
 Ben Lyons – correspondent (2012; now at ESPN)
 Holly Madison – Las Vegas insider (2011)
 Charlie Maher – correspondent (2003–2004)
 Jeannie Mai – weekend anchor/correspondent (2009–2010; now co-host of The Real)
 Mark McGrath – anchor/correspondent (2004–2008; later host of Don't Forget the Lyrics!)
 Maria Menounos – weekday co-anchor (2011–2014; later at E! News)
 Terry Murphy – correspondent (2003–2004)
 Dave Nemeth – weekday anchor/correspondent (1994-1996; now at KSTU in Utah)
 Arthel Neville – weekday anchor/correspondent (1994–1996; now at Fox News)
 Barry Nolan – correspondent (2000–2004)
 Maureen O'Boyle – anchor/correspondent (1995-1996, 1997–2000; later at WBTV in Charlotte)
 Christina Olivares – correspondent (2004)
 Jerry Penacoli – correspondent/announcer (2000–2019)
 Scott Rapoport – correspondent (1998–2000)
 Tanika Ray – weekday co-anchor (2017–2019; previously served as weekend anchor/correspondent from 2004 to 2009)
 Lauren Sánchez – weekend anchor/correspondent (1997–2000, 2009–2010)
 Rick Schwartz – correspondent (1996–2000)
 Phil Shuman – correspondent (1996–2003; now at KTTV in Los Angeles)
 Gina Silva – correspondent (1997–2000; now at KTTV in Los Angeles)
 Tava Smiley – correspondent (2003–2004)
 Larry Stern – correspondent (2003–2004)
Les Trent – correspondent (1998–2000; now at Inside Edition)
 Alison Waite – Las Vegas insider (2010)
 Libby Weaver – anchor/correspondent (1996–1997; now at KDVR in Denver)

Production
Extra employs a staff of about 150 people, consisting of hosts and correspondents presenting story packages, and editors, producers, library staff and film crews who produce and compile the program. The program is taped at Universal Studios Hollywood each Monday through Friday from 10:00 a.m. to 4:00 p.m. Pacific Time Zone, and is taped before a live audience, allowing fans to interact with the show's hosts and see live appearances from actors, musicians, athletes and newsmakers interviewed at the theme park for the program. Extra also takes a unique approach in keeping its viewers in the loop by taking them on coast-to-coast trips each edition, from Hollywood to Planet Hollywood in Las Vegas to its studio at the H&M Times Square store in New York City. The program won its first Emmy Award in 2014, tying with Entertainment Tonight for "Best Entertainment News Program".

International carriage
Only the weekday editions of the program are broadcast outside the U.S.; the 44-minute weekend edition is only distributed domestically.
 In Canada, the weekday editions of the program airs on a day-behind basis on Citytv after 1 a.m., with a rebroadcast after 2:30 a.m.
 In Australia, the weekday editions of Extra began airing on the Nine Network (who also runs a television datacast channel and news program of the same name) on July 2, 2012 until its 26th season, replacing Entertainment Tonight after Nine declined to renew its contract. Extra use to air at 1pm weekdays.

References

External links
 
 

1994 American television series debuts
1990s American television news shows
2000s American television news shows
2010s American television news shows
2020s American television news shows
English-language television shows
Entertainment news shows in the United States
First-run syndicated television programs in the United States
Television series by Warner Bros. Television Studios
Television series by Telepictures
Television shows filmed in California